Simorcus is a genus of spiders in the family Thomisidae. It was first described in 1895 by Simon. , it contains 13 species.

Species
Simorcus comprises 13 species:
Simorcus asiaticus Ono & Song, 1989  – China
Simorcus capensis Simon, 1895 – Tanzania, South Africa
Simorcus coronatus Simon, 1907 – West, Central Africa
Simorcus cotti Lessert, 1936 – Tanzania, Mozambique, Eswatini, South Africa
Simorcus cummingae van Niekerk & Dippenaar-Schoeman, 2010 – Botswana, Zimbabwe
Simorcus guinea van Niekerk & Dippenaar-Schoeman, 2010 – Guinea, Congo
Simorcus haddadi van Niekerk & Dippenaar-Schoeman, 2010 – South Africa
Simorcus hakos van Niekerk & Dippenaar-Schoeman, 2010 – Namibia
Simorcus itombwe van Niekerk & Dippenaar-Schoeman, 2010 – Congo
Simorcus kalemie van Niekerk & Dippenaar-Schoeman, 2010 – Congo
Simorcus lotzi van Niekerk & Dippenaar-Schoeman, 2010 – Namibia, Botswana, South Africa
Simorcus okavango van Niekerk & Dippenaar-Schoeman, 2010 – Botswana
Simorcus vanharteni van Niekerk & Dippenaar-Schoeman, 2010 – Yemen, Tanzania

References

Thomisidae
Araneomorphae genera
Spiders of Africa
Spiders of China